Ruffell is a surname. Notable people with the surname include:

Bill Ruffell, English footballer
Charles Ruffell, British athlete
H. P. Ruffell Smith, British physicist
Jimmy Ruffell, English footballer
Ralph Ruffell, English footballer
Suzi Ruffell, British comedian, writer, and actress

See also
George Ruffell Memorial Shield